Manguru "Martin" Frederick (born 17 May 2000) is an Australian rules footballer of Sudanese descent who plays for Port Adelaide in the Australian Football League (AFL).

He made his AFL debut in Round 6 of the 2021 AFL season against  at Adelaide Oval.

References

External links

2000 births
Australian people of South Sudanese descent
Sportspeople of South Sudanese descent
Living people
Port Adelaide Football Club players
Port Adelaide Football Club players (all competitions)
Australian rules footballers from Adelaide
Australian twins
Twin sportspeople
Woodville-West Torrens Football Club players
South Sudanese players of Australian rules football